is a 1950 black-and-white Japanese film directed by Tetsuo Ichikawa.

Cast
 Hibari Misora
 Kyōji Sugi
 Kashō Sanyūtei
 Toshiaki Minami
 Kan'ichi Katō
 室修平
 Yūsaku Terashima
 Kōji Nakata
 Eiko Taki
 Yōko Wakasugi
 Toshiko Ayukawa
 Haruyo Ichikawa
 Akira Kishii
 Shin Morikawa

References

Japanese black-and-white films
1955 films
Shochiku films
Japanese drama films
1955 drama films
1950s Japanese films